The first cabinet of Titu Maiorescu was the government of Romania from 14 October 1912 to 31 December 1913.

Ministers
The ministers of the cabinet were as follows:

President of the Council of Ministers:
Titu Maiorescu (14 October 1912 - 31 December 1913)
Minister of the Interior: 
Take Ionescu (14 October 1912 - 31 December 1913)
Minister of Foreign Affairs: 
Titu Maiorescu (14 October 1912 - 31 December 1913)
Minister of Finance:
Alexandru Marghiloman (14 October 1912 - 31 December 1913)
Minister of Justice:
Mihail G. Cantacuzino (14 October 1912 - 31 December 1913)
Minister of War:
Gen. Constantin Hârjeu (14 October 1912 - 31 December 1913)
Minister of Religious Affairs and Public Instruction:
Constantin G. Dissescu (14 October 1912 - 31 December 1913)
Minister of Industry and Commerce:
Nicolae Xenopol (14 October 1912 - 31 December 1913)
Minister of Agriculture and Property:
Nicolae Filipescu (14 October 1912 - 5 April 1913)
Constantin C. Arion (5 April - 31 December 1913)
Minister of Public Works:
Alexandru A. Bădărău (14 October 1912 - 31 December 1913)

References

Cabinets of Romania
Cabinets established in 1912
Cabinets disestablished in 1913
1912 establishments in Romania
1913 disestablishments in Romania